The Congress Column is a monumental column in Brussels, Belgium, commemorating the creation of the Belgian Constitution by the National Congress of 1830–31. Inspired by Trajan's Column in Rome, it was erected between 1850 and 1859, on the initiative of the then-Prime Minister of Belgium, Charles Rogier, according to a design by the architect Joseph Poelaert. At the top of the column is a statue of Belgium's first monarch; King Leopold I, and at its base, the pedestal is surrounded by statues personifying the four freedoms guaranteed under the Constitution. The Belgian Tomb of the Unknown Soldier with an eternal flame lies at its foot.

The column is located on the /; a small square adjacent to the Rue Royale/Koningsstraat, in the Freedom Quarter. This area is served by Brussels-Congress railway station, the metro stations Parc/Park (on lines 1 and 5) and Botanique/Kruidtuin (on lines 2 and 6), as well as the tram stop / on lines 92 and 93.

History

Background
Following Belgian Independence in 1830, the desire to consolidate a still fragile identity led to a mania for monuments and a taste for national history. This expression of ardent patriotism, which mainly found its inspiration in the Middle Ages, led for example to the installation of a statue of Andreas Vesalius in the centre of the /, and another of the Counts of Egmont and Horn on the Grand-Place/Grote Markt (Brussels' main square).

At the same time, the new Rue Royale/Koningsstraat, which remained unbuilt in its middle on the western side, defined an open space called then the / (the current /), which offered a beautiful view of the city and its surroundings. In 1850, to commemorate Independence and the work of the National Congress, which had laid the foundations of the Belgian State twenty years earlier, the Parliament, on the initiative of the then-Prime Minister of Belgium, Charles Rogier, thus decided to build a Congress Column on this site.

Construction (1850–1859)

The first stone was laid down in presence of King Leopold I on 24 September 1850 and the monument was inaugurated on 26 September 1859. The architect Joseph Poelaert (who was later to also build Brussels' Palace of Justice) was responsible for the execution of the works, under the supervision of the Monuments Commission, and the sculptures of the monument were entrusted to five sculptors, amongst which Eugène Simonis.

In the centre of the Place des Panoramas, renamed the Place du Congrès for the occasion, the column became the focal point of the neighbouring / district (today's Freedom Quarter). The development plans for this formerly mostly working-class district, cleaned up between 1875 and 1885, attempted to free up the perspective of the column and organise the road network around it accordingly. At the same time, the architect Jean-Pierre Cluysenaar took charge of creating, below the square, a covered market which replaced some populous alleys or ill-famed dead-ends bordering the (now-disappeared) /.

20th and 21st centuries
The Belgian Tomb of the Unknown Soldier with an eternal flame was installed at the foot of the Congress Column in 1922, in memory of the Belgian soldiers who died during World War I. In 1929, it was the site of an attempted assassination of Crown Prince Umberto of Italy by Fernando de Rosa.

Severely degraded by time, the Congress Column was cleaned in 1968 for the first time since its erection. The monument was again the subject between 1997 and 2008 of major renovation works divided into different phases. In 2001, the plinth and the four corner bronze statues underwent a deep cleaning, using the laser technique. The corner statues were then coated with wax. In July 2002, work began on cleaning and restoring the column itself, again using laser cleaning technology. The works were finished in November 2002, allowing for the Armistice Day ceremonies to take place at the site.

Description
A spiral staircase of 193 steps inside the column leads to a platform, decorated with a lavishly carved balustrade, surrounding the pedestal of the  statue of King Leopold I. The platform can accommodate 16 visitors but is no longer accessible for security reasons. The statue of Leopold was made by the sculptor Guillaume Geefs.

Designed by Poelaert and inspired by Trajan's Column in Rome, the column commemorates the National Congress of 1830–31 which drafted the liberal Belgian Constitution of 1831. The important dates in the struggle for Belgian Independence are engraved on column's pedestal, together with the names of the members of the National Congress and the Provisional Government of Belgium, as well as important passages from the Constitution. The frieze is decorated with elegant foliage and on its four sides are represented Wisdom, Strength, Immortality and Glory.

On the base of the column, surrounding the pedestal, four sitting allegorical bronze female sculptures represent the major constitutional liberties enshrined in the Constitution of 1831: the 'Freedom of Association' by Charles Fraikin, the 'Freedom of Worship' by Eugène Simonis, the 'Freedom of the Press' and the 'Freedom of Education' both by Joseph Geefs. Two monumental bronze lions by Eugène Simonis are placed in front of the monument. In 2007, during Storm Kyrill, the 'Freedom of the Press' sculpture was blown down and later restored.

Monument to the Unknown Soldier

As a memorial to the Belgian victims of World War I, an unknown soldier was buried at the foot of the monument on 11 November 1922. This unknown soldier was selected out of five unidentified soldiers from different battle sites by Raymond Haesebrouck, a veteran blinded in battle. The tomb is surmounted by an eternal flame.

After World War II, a second memorial plaque was added to the monument to honour the Belgian victims. In 1998, a third memorial plaque was dedicated to the Belgian soldiers killed in the service of peace since 1945.

See also

 Belgium in "the long nineteenth century"
 Neoclassical architecture in Belgium
 Timeline of Brussels
 Berlin Victory Column
 July Column
 Nelson's Column

References

Footnotes

Notes

Bibliography

External links

Buildings and structures in Brussels
City of Brussels
Tourist attractions in Brussels
Monumental columns in Belgium
World War I memorials in Belgium
Neoclassical architecture in Belgium
Constitution of Belgium
Cultural infrastructure completed in 1859
1850 in Belgium